Leshko is a mountainous village in Blagoevgrad Municipality, in Blagoevgrad Province, Bulgaria. It is situated in the foothills of Vlahina mountain.

References

Villages in Blagoevgrad Province